John Wegner  (16 January 1950 – 17 November 2019) was a German-born Australian operatic baritone.

Awards
In the 2016 Queen's Birthday Honours Wegner was appointed an Officer of the Order of Australia (AO) for "distinguished service to the performing arts as a world renowned operatic bass-baritone, and as an ambassador for the cultural reputation of Australia".

Mo Awards
The Australian Entertainment Mo Awards (commonly known informally as the Mo Awards), were annual Australian entertainment industry awards. They recognise achievements in live entertainment in Australia from 1975 to 2016.
 (wins only)
|-
| 1998
| John Wegner
| Operatic Performance of the Year
| 
|-

References

External links
 Official website
 John Wegner (Baritone) Bach Cantatas Website
 John Wegner AO Parade College Hall of Fame
 Old Paradians mourn the passing of John Wegner AO

1950 births
2019 deaths
Australian operatic baritones
Officers of the Order of Australia
Helpmann Award winners
International Emmy Award for Best Arts Programming winners
Victorian College of the Arts alumni
German emigrants to Australia
Neurological disease deaths in New South Wales